Josef Musil (3 July 1932 – 26 August 2017) was a Czech volleyball player. He won two Olympic medals, in 1964 and 1968, as well as five world and three European championships medals in 1952–1967.

References

External links
  

1932 births
2017 deaths
Czech men's volleyball players
Czechoslovak men's volleyball players
Olympic volleyball players of Czechoslovakia
Volleyball players at the 1964 Summer Olympics
Volleyball players at the 1968 Summer Olympics
Olympic silver medalists for Czechoslovakia
Olympic bronze medalists for Czechoslovakia
Recipients of Medal of Merit (Czech Republic)
Olympic medalists in volleyball
Medalists at the 1968 Summer Olympics
Medalists at the 1964 Summer Olympics
People from Nymburk District
Sportspeople from the Central Bohemian Region